Seth Ahmed Dawood (15 March 1899 – 2 January 2002) was a Pakistani industrialist and a philanthropist. Dawood founded several companies and The Dawood Foundation (TDF), which established the Dawood College of Engineering and Technology (renamed Dawood University of Engineering & Technology after being granted the status of a university in 2013).

Early life 
Dawood was born in Bantva, a small town in Kathiawar, British India, as the second born and eldest son of seven children in a trader family. He had three years of formal education, like many others in his time and environs. He followed the family tradition and went into the family business. When he was 12, he was sent to stay with his maternal grandfather, Abdul Ghani Haji Noor Muhammad. Over two years, he learned basic trade of cotton yarn, wheat, and grains in Shimoga (later Karnataka).  He was then sent for another two years to the Madras area and assigned more responsibilities. The death of his father Yaqoob was a turning point in his life. Ahmed moved to Bombay and started his own business at the age of 15. Under the supervision of his grandfather, he opened a shop in Hanuman Building at the Tamba Kanta market area of Bombay.

When he was 18 or 19 years old, Dawood married Aysha. The couple had two sons – Aziz Dawood and Yousuf Dawood — and one daughter named Khadijah (Khatoo Bai). Around 10 years later, his wife Aysha Bai died because of tuberculosis. He then married Mariam Bai and the couple had two children, Hussain Dawood and Amina Bai.

Professional life in Bombay
Dawood's initial ventures in the spice trade ended in bankruptcy. He then opened a small shop in Tamba Kanta to deal in cotton and silk yarn. His strategy involved purchasing wholesale and selling retail. By 1933 he was with his firm the biggest supplier of imported yarn to the textile mills in British India. He also set up a cotton ginning factory in his hometown of Bantva, an oil mill in Madras, and a banaspati ghee (clarified butter) factory in Kolkata. With a special license granted by the British colonial government, Dawood set up an army vehicle disposable depot in Chattogram. Such depots were established after the end of the first World War and required a license.

Dawood further acquired an automobile service and repair company which carried out operations on a large scale. Altogether, Dawood had some 26 shops and offices across British India. He was about to finalise a deal with one of the leading traders and industrialists of the time, Nagindas Fulchand Chinai, to establish a viscose manufacturing joint venture when India got partitioned.

Move to Pakistan
Dawood left India and moved with his siblings and their entire families to Pakistan soon after its founding with personal belongings they could carry.

Around the time of the Partition, he supported his community and helped in the escape of Muslims from Bantva and Kathiawar via Bombay to Pakistan.

Professional life in Pakistan
Dawood and his three brothers — Suleman Dawood, Siddiq Dawood, and Sattar Dawood — started new business activities as Dawood Cooperation Ltd. with an office in Karachi's old business area New Chali and soon after opened a shop on Saleh Muhammad Street (adjacent to Bandar Road) for trading textile and yarn. Therefore, the Dawood Cooperation was established in Pakistan and in Manchester.

 In the following decades, particular in the 1950s and 1960s, Dawood founded several businesses and chaired companies in the cotton, textiles, paper, consumer goods, oil, logistics, insurance, jute, chemicals, motorbikes, home appliances, electronics, and fertilisers industries in East and West Pakistan. He rose to prominence at the national level and became a major figure in the industrialisation of Karachi. The family-run business also emerged as a leading players in the export sector and many associated companies won awards.

Pakistan's former president Field Marshall Ayub Khan often consulted Dawood on trade and industry affairs.

Dawood sat on the board of directors of many local companies. In 1962, he founded the National Investment Trust and was its first chairman. He was also the vice-chairman of Pakistan Industrial Credit and Investment Corporation (PICIC), one of the first development finance institutions in the country.

In 1968, Dawood partnered with the American company Hercules Inc. A private loan from the World Bank's International Finance Corporation (IFC) supported the realisation of the fertiliser factory in Sheikhpura. In 1969, the expansion of multiple projects peaked: Dawood Petroleum Ltd started construction of its Oil Terminal at Keamari. The Dawood Jute Mills were set up in East Pakistan, and the construction of the Dawood Hercules Chemical Fertilizer factory started. The IFC invested into the expansion of the Karnaphuli Paper Mills in East Pakistan. The project to assemble motorbikes in Pakistan known as Dawood Yamaha Ltd. started in the same year. At the peak of his economic ventures in 1970, the different entities Dawood chaired employed 35,000 people. It was also the year his mother Hajiani Hanifa Bai Dawood died.

As a result of the independence of Bangladesh in 1971, assets and properties in East Pakistan of residents of West Pakistan were confiscated and nationalised. Dawood and his family lost factories in Dhaka and Chittagong — including Karnaphuli Paper Mills Limited, Karnaphuli Rayon and Chemical Limited, Dawood Jute Mills Limited and Dawood Shipping Company Limited — accounting for 60% of their industrial undertakings. All investments in the former eastern part of the country were lost.
The pressure also increased for the remaining businesses in Pakistan and for Dawood. In January 1972 he and other industrialists were put under house arrest. The Government initiated nationalisation of many local private companies across the country. In the same year, the nationalisation process affected many industries including those of Dawood and his family. He lost two million rupees and profitable industrial projects, namely Dawood Petroleum Limited and Central Life Insurance Company Limited. Dawood Petroleum was put under martial law in 1972, and the Oil business became in 1974 an official part of Pakistan State Oil (PSO).
Dawood "was downsized to almost insignificance [but] he did not give up, he continued to develop things though at a much lesser scale".

Of the remaining businesses that Dawood chaired, Dawood Hercules Chemical Ltd. and their fertiliser factory in Sheikhupura near Lahore was a profitable joint venture. This, along with the Lawrencepur Woollen and Textile Mills Limited, Dawood Cotton Mills Limited, Burewala Textile Mills Limited, and Dilon Limited, was the backbone of Dawood's economic activities.

In 1975, disappointed with the nationalisation policy of the government, Dawood and his wife left Pakistan for the US. While abroad, he set up an oil exploration company that discovered oil wells in Texas. He then returned to Pakistan in 1977.

By the late 1970s and early 80s, although the corporation was doing well financially, Dawood's siblings parted ways with him.

In 1990, Dawood bought the stake of the American partner of the joint venture and as Chairman, acquired all of Hercules' stakes.

Social and welfare services
 Dawood focused his philanthropic activities on health and education. In 1950, he created the Dawood Trust to provide scholarships and financial help for students and educational institutions. He transformed the Trust into an educational Foundation, which became The Dawood Foundation (TDF) in February 1960. In 1962 TDF founded the Dawood College of Engineering and Technology in Karachi, which became nationalised in 1971.

In 1983, he founded the Dawood Public School in Karachi's Dawood Colony. Dawood's children and those from his extended family all went abroad to the UK for schooling and to prestigious universities in the UK and the US.

TDF was involved in the construction and administration of various schools, colleges, and madrassas. It also offered stipends and scholarships to students for higher education.

Dawood and his family have also been involved in the construction of Masjid-e-Quba in Karachi's Dawood Colony. He has also been engaged in welfare of the Memon community. In 1981, he was involved in the creation of a united platform for Memons. The United Memon Jamat of Pakistan (UMJP) was formed to create a joint organisation of Halai, Kutchi and Sindhi Memons.

He was also engaged in the establishment of the Al-Shifa Trust in Rawalpindi in 1986 to which he donated generously.

Dawood died 2 January 2002 in Karachi at the age of 102. Dawood is buried in the grounds of the Mewa Shah Graveyard of Karachi.

In 2003, Lahore University of Management Sciences (LUMS) established the Ahmed Dawood Chair at the SBA School of Science and Engineering Dean in his honor.

Awards
Dawood received awards for achievements in areas including economy, finance, education, social welfare, trade, and industry. These included Hilal-e-Khidmat (in 1962) and Baba-e-Ittehad (in 1986).

References

Sources
 
 

1905 births
2002 deaths
Burials at Mewa Shah Graveyard
Businesspeople from Karachi
A
Founders of Pakistani schools and colleges
Gujarati people
Memon people
Pakistani company founders
Pakistani industrialists
Pakistani people of Gujarati descent
Pakistani philanthropists
Pakistani prisoners and detainees